Elle LaMont is an American film and television actress. Her roles include Screwhead in the film Alita: Battle Angel. She is also known for the films Strings, Mercy Black, and Flay.

Filmography

Film

Television

References

External links
 

Living people
20th-century American actresses
21st-century American actresses
American television actresses
Year of birth missing (living people)